Zgornja Senarska is a settlement in the Municipality of Sveta Trojica v Slovenskih Goricah in northeastern Slovenia. The area is part of the traditional region of Styria and is now included in the Drava Statistical Region.

There are two small chapels in the settlement. One dates to the early 19th century and the other was built in 1922.

References

External links
Zgornja Senarska at Geopedia

Populated places in the Municipality of Sveta Trojica v Slovenskih Goricah